From the Heart is an album by Welsh mezzo-soprano Katherine Jenkins, released in China in 2007. It is a compilation of tracks from Jenkins' previous UK albums.

Track listing
 "Nella Fantasia"
 "(Quello Che Faró) Sarà Per Te (Everything I Do) I Do It For You"
 "Time to Say Goodbye (Con Te Partiró)"
 "Pearl Fishers"/"The Flower Duet"
 "Caruso"
 "Turandot"/"Nessun Dorma!"
 "L'Amore Sei Tu" ("I Will Always Love You")
 "Vide Cor Meum"
 "Prayer"
 "Canto"
 "Carmen/Chanson Bohème"
 "Hymn to the Fallen"
 "Canto Della Terra"
 "Cinema Paradiso"/"Se"

2007 compilation albums
Katherine Jenkins albums
Polydor Records compilation albums